Timovo is a rural locality (a village) in Yugskoye Rural Settlement, Cherepovetsky District, Vologda Oblast, Russia. The population was 39 as of 2002.

Geography 
Timovo is located 66 km southeast of Cherepovets (the district's administrative centre) by road. Mydyevo is the nearest rural locality.

References 

Rural localities in Cherepovetsky District